is a 2018 Japanese historical drama television series and the 57th NHK taiga drama. It stars Ryohei Suzuki as Saigō Takamori, who has been dubbed the last true samurai.

Plot
The drama follows the life of historical figure Saigō Takamori. Born the first son of a lower-class samurai, he was exiled two times and went through three marriages. He was one of the central figures of the Meiji Restoration but later rebelled against the government over dissatisfaction with Meiji reforms.

Cast

Saigo family
Ryohei Suzuki as Saigō Takamori
Ao Watanabe as Kokichi (young Takamori)
Keiko Matsuzaka as Saigō Masa, the mother of Takamori
Morio Kazama as Saigō Kichibei, the father of Takamori
Toshiyuki Nishida as Saigō Kikujirō, Takamori's son
Yuki Imai as Teen Kikujirō
Kairi Jō as Child Kikujirō
Ai Hashimoto as Suga, the first wife of Takamori
Haru Kuroki as Iwayama Ito, the third wife of Takamori
Konomi Watanabe as young Ito
Ryo Nishikido as Saigō Jūdō, one of Takamori's brothers
Taiyō Saitō as Saigō Shingo (young Jūdō)
Mone Kamishiraishi as Saigō Kiyo, the wife of Jūdō
Gōta Watabe as Saigō Kichijirō, one of Takamori's brothers
Taketo Arai as young Kichijirō
Yuki Kashiwagi as Saigō Sono, the wife of Kichijirō
Nanami Sakuraba as Ichiki (née Saigō) Koto, one of Takamori's sisters
Yuki Kurimoto as young Koto
Yūki Maekawa as Ichiki Sōsuke, Koto's son
Yū Kayano as Saigō Yasu, one of Takamori's sisters
Kumi Mizuno as Kimi, the grandmother of Takamori
Kon Ōmura as Saigō Ryūemon, the grandfather of Takamori
Muga Tsukaji (Drunk Dragon) as Kumakichi
Mayuko Saigō as Saigō Sakurako
Maika Hara as Saigō Taka, one of Takamori's sisters
Yūki Yagi as Saigō Kikusō, Takamori's daughter

Ōkubo family
Eita as Ōkubo Toshimichi
Tatsuki Ishikawa as young Toshimichi
Rie Mimura as Ōkubo Masu, the wife of Toshimichi
Mitsuru Hirata as Ōkubo Jiemon, the father of Toshimichi
Mariko Fuji as Ōkubo Fuku, the mother of Toshimichi
Tamami Kusaka as Ōkubo Suma
Yuki Uchida as Oyū

Satsuma Domain
Ken Watanabe as Shimazu Nariakira, the master of Takamori
Munetaka Aoki as Shimazu Hisamitsu
Takeshi Kaga as Shimazu Narioki
Rumiko Koyanagi as Yura
Raita Ryu as Zusho Hirosato
Seiya Osada as Shimazu Mochihisa
Rasei Nakajima as young Mochihisa
Naho Toda as Kiku
Yukiya Kitamura as Ōyama Kakunosuke (later Ōyama Tsunayoshi)
Naoki Inukai as young Kakunosuke
Mitsuomi Takahashi as Arimura Shunsai (later Kaeda Nobuyoshi)
Yūto Ikeda as young Shunsai
Arata Horii as Murata Shinpachi
Kenshirō Katō as young Shinpachi
Ikki Sawamura as Akayama Yukie
Jun Itoda as Katsura Hisatake
Yu Tokui as Yamada Tamehisa
Shūichirō Masuda as Arima Shinshichi
Masaki Izawa as young Shinshichi
Takurō Ōno as Nakamura Hanjirō
Rukito Nakamura as young Hanjirō
Manabu Hamada as Sakoda Tomonoshin
Shiori Sugioka as Oaki
Tomoya Warabino as Ebihara Shigekatsu
Keita Machida as Komatsu Tatewaki
Yoshimasa Kondo as Tanaka Yūnosuke
Ayumi Tanida as Koba Den'nai
Teppei Akashi as Narahara Kihachirō
Yūki Izumisawa as Kawaji Toshiyoshi
Hideo Sakaki as Shinohara Kunimoto
Yūshin Shinohara as Beppu Shinsuke
General public
Rin Takanashi as Fuki
Rinka Kakihara as young Fuki
Taku Suzuki (Drunk Dragon) as Heiroku, Fuki's father
Sumie Sasaki as Ishi, Kumakichi's grandmother
Fujita Okamoto as Itagaki Yosaji
Toshiyuki Kitami as Ijūin Naogorō, Suga's father
Masayuki Shionoya as Iwayama Naoatsu, Ito's father
The people of Amami Ōshima
Fumi Nikaidō as Aikana, the second wife of Takamori
Akira Emoto as Ryū Samin
Midori Kiuchi as Ishichiyo Kane
Natsuko Akiyama as Yuta
Tsutomu Takahashi as Tomiken
Honami Kurashita as Komurume
Anna Sato as Satochiyo Kane
The people of Okinoerabujima
Renji Ishibashi as Kawaguchi Seppō
Yoshiki Saitō as Tsuchimochi Masateru
Yōko Ōshima as Tsuchimochi Tsuru

Chōshū Domain
Tetsuji Tamayama as Kido Takayoshi
Kenta Hamano as Itō Hirobumi
Hayashiya Shōzō IX as Ōmura Masujirō
Hikaru Futagami as Kusaka Genzui
Osaomu Kaō as Shiraishi Shōichirō
Riki Choshu as Kijima Matabei
Manabu Ino as Kikkawa Kenmotsu
Masayuki Satō as Miyoshi Shinzō

Tosa Domain
Shun Oguri as Sakamoto Ryōma
Asami Mizukawa as Oryō, the wife of Ryōma
Shogo Yamaguchi as Nakaoka Shintarō
Akira Otaka as Yamauchi Yōdō, the lord of Tosa
Ryo Segawa as Gotō Shōjirō

Fukui Domain
Kanji Tsuda as Matsudaira Shungaku
Shunsuke Kazama as Hashimoto Sanai
Asahi Yoshida as Nakane Yukie

Tokugawa shogunate
Shota Matsuda as Tokugawa Yoshinobu, the last shōgun
Kenichi Endō as Katsu Kaishū
Naoki Matayoshi as Tokugawa Iesada, the 13th shōgun
Tamotsu Kanshūji as Tokugawa Iemochi, the 14th shōgun
Towa Araki as young Iemochi
Naohito Fujiki as Abe Masahiro
Shirō Sano as Ii Naosuke
Shinji Asakura as Hotta Masayoshi 
Satoshi Jimbo as Nagano Shuzen
Takahiro Fujimoto as Yamaoka Tesshū
Jundai Yamada as Hiraoka Enshirō
Masami Horiuchi as Itakura Katsukiyo
Ōoku
Keiko Kitagawa as "Tenshō-in" Atsuhime
Yoko Minamino as Ikushima, the tutor of Atsuhime
Pinko Izumi as Honjuin, Iesada's mother

Aizu and Kuwana Domains
Shuji Kashiwabara as Matsudaira Katamori
Ken Shōnozaki as Matsudaira Sadaaki

Imperial Court
Nakamura Kotarō VI as Emperor Kōmei
Nomura Man'nojō VI as Emperor Meiji
Shōfukutei Tsurube II as Iwakura Tomomi
Tomiyuki Kunihiro as Konoe Tadahiro
Nomura Manzō IX as Sanjō Sanetomi
Takeshi Nadagi as Nakagawa-no-miya
Kenichi Ogata as Nakayama Tadayasu
Yasuto Kosuda as Prince Arisugawa Taruhito

The Government of Meiji
Shugo Oshinari as Inoue Kaoru
Shingo Murakami as Yamagata Aritomo
Kiyohiko Shibukawa as Itagaki Taisuke
Hiroyuki Onoue as Ōkuma Shigenobu
Takaya Sakoda as Etō Shinpei

Foreigners
Thane Camus as Harry Smith Parkes
Hannah Grace as Mrs. Parkes
Steve Wiley as Ernest Mason Satow
Blake Crawford as Townsend Harris
Gilles Beaufils as Léon Roches
Noam Katz as Charles Lennox Richardson
Nathan Berry as Dr. William Willis

Others
Masatō Ibu as Tokugawa Nariaki, the father of Yoshinobu
Onoe Kikunosuke V as Getshō
Kimihiko Hasegawa as Date Munenari
Takayasu Komiya as Tokugawa Yoshikatsu
Michiko Tanaka as Tama
Takashi Tome as Den'emon
Hitori Gekidan as John Manjirō
Haruna Kondō (Harisenbon) as Tora
Michifumi Isoda as Naiki Jinzaburō, the first mayor of Kyoto
Kōkichi Tanoue as Naoo Nakahara

Production

Production Credits
Narrator – Toshiyuki Nishida
Music – Harumi Fūki
Historical research – Izumi Haraguchi, Manabu Ōishi and Michifumi Isoda
Architectural research – Kiyoshi Hirai
Costume designer – Kazuko Kurosawa
Kagoshima dialect instructors – Takaya Sakoda and Kōkichi Tanoue

The series is based on the novel Segodon! by Mariko Hayashi which was first released in serial format starting February 2016 in the literature magazine Hon no Tabibito, and published as a book by Kadokawa Shoten the year after.

Casting
Ryohei Suzuki was announced to portray the lead role of Saigō Takamori in Segodon on November 2, 2016. The main cast for the Saigo and Okuba family were announced on March 27, 2017, which includes Eita, Haru Kuroki, Nanami Sakuraba, Gōta Watabe, Muga Tsukaji, Morio Kazama, Mitsuru Hirata, and Keiko Matsuzaka. The main cast for the Shimazu family was announced on June 27, 2017, which includes Munetaka Aoki, Naho Toda, Yu Tokui, and Ken Watanabe. In September 2017, it was announced that Yuki Saito would not be able to play as Ikushima, and was eventually replaced by Yoko Minamino. By November 2017, Etsuko Ichihara also had to drop out as narrator of the series due to her ongoing recovery from encephalomyelitis, and was eventually replaced by Toshiyuki Nishida.

TV schedule

Highlight

Soundtracks
"Segodon" Taiga Drama Original Soundtrack I (February 21, 2018)
"Segodon" Taiga Drama Original Soundtrack II (August 8, 2018)
"Segodon" Taiga Drama Original Soundtrack III (October 10, 2018)

See also

Bakumatsu

References

External links
Official Site 

Taiga drama
2018 Japanese television series debuts
2018 Japanese television series endings
Cultural depictions of Tokugawa Yoshinobu
Television shows written by Miho Nakazono
Television series set in the 1840s
Television series set in the 1850s
Television series set in the 1860s
Television series set in the 1870s
Television series set in the 1880s
Television series set in the 1890s